Agustín Vernice (born 3 July 1995 in Bahia Blanca) is an Argentine sprint canoeist. He qualified to compete for Argentina at the 2020 Summer Olympics in the men's K-1 1000 metres event.

References

External links 
 Agustín Vernice at the 2019 Pan American Games

1995 births
Living people
Argentine male canoeists
Place of birth missing (living people)
Pan American Games medalists in canoeing
Pan American Games gold medalists for Argentina
Canoeists at the 2019 Pan American Games
Medalists at the 2019 Pan American Games
Canoeists at the 2020 Summer Olympics
Olympic canoeists of Argentina
Sportspeople from Bahía Blanca
21st-century Argentine people